Hesperia High School is a public four-year high school within the Hesperia Unified School District located in Hesperia, San Bernardino County, California. It is one of seven comprehensive high schools in the district.

The school currently is enrolled with less than 2,000 students in grades 9–12. Twice has the school's student body swelled to 4,000, forcing the HUSD to open Sultana High School, in 1995 and Oak Hills High School, in 2009. The school's official mascot is the scorpion and the colors are "Vegas gold" and black. 
Hesperia High School was the first high school to open in Hesperia, California in fall 1984, making it the oldest high school in the Hesperia Unified School District.

The high school is currently making a transition to an academy-like structure. This academy will allow students to earn college credit; however, instead of going to a separate campus students will be able to attend during school hours. This provides the advantage for the students, because they will simultaneously earn college credit and their A through G requirements in order to graduate from high school. This is the first campus to offer this type of opportunity in the high desert.

Hesperia High School was featured in a documentary called Shakespeare High about its drama department's success in the Shakespearean Festival in Southern California.

Demographics
Data from 2020-2021, 2019-2020, 2018-2019 academic school years.

90.1% of the students are minorities.

9.9% White

78.8% Hispanic

8.5% Black

1.4% Asian

0.8% Two or More Races

0.3% Native Hawaiian/Pacific Islander

0.2% American Indian/Alaska Native

Graduation requirements
All students who attend Hesperia High School must meet the following criteria to graduate. 
4 years of English (40 credits) 
3 years of Social Studies (30 credits)
2 years of Mathematics (20 credits) 
3 years of Science (30 credits) 
2 years of Physical Education (20 credits) 
1 year of either a Performing Art or a Foreign Language (10 credits) 
70 credits worth of electives 
Pass the CAHSEE 
Overall, a student must have 220 credits accumulated from these subjects to graduate. As of the 2011-2012 school year, Hesperia High School has a graduation rate of 89.6%. (May be old so ask your counselor to make sure this is correct).

Academics

AP courses
AP Art History 
AP Studio Art
AP Biology
AP Calculus AB 
AP Chemistry 
AP Computer Science A
AP Computer Science Principles
AP Macroeconomics 
AP English Language and Composition 
AP English Literature and Composition 
AP Environmental Science 
AP European History 
AP French Language
AP United States Government and Politics 
AP Physics 1
AP Psychology 
AP Spanish Language 
AP Spanish Literature 
AP Statistics 
AP US History

Honors courses
English I Honors
English II Honors
World History/Geography/Cultures Honors

Sports
Hesperia High School offers a wide variety of sports to its students. Among them are: 
Baseball
Girls Basketball
Boys Basketball
Cheer
Cross Country
Football
Golf
Girls Soccer
Boys Soccer
Softball
Tennis
Track
Volleyball
Wrestling
The school owns 8 tennis courts, 3 soccer fields, 2 softball fields, 2 baseball fields, and a football stadium recently constructed in 2006. In the athletic department, Hesperia High School won the 1985 girls cross country CIF championship the 2022 boys golf CIF championship, and the 2007 softball CIF championship.

Hesperia Broadcasting

Hesperia Broadcasting is the production company of the Broadcast Journalism class offered at Hesperia High School. Starting from the school year 2013-2014, Hesperia Broadcasting was the first in the High Desert to have their newscast, “Scorpion News”, deliver their news with a live anchor in high definition. The first live episode was aired October 31, 2013. Not only does Hesperia Broadcasting air Scorpion News to the high school, they also film other events such as the annual sophomore Poetry Slam and Mr. Scorpion competition.

Scorpion News
Scorpion News is a student-run newscast that films and edits video to give video announcements to the students and staff and highlight Hesperia High School. Scorpion News is part of Hesperia Broadcasting productions and was created in the 2010-2011 school year by the Broadcast Journalism teacher, Mr. Smith.  Four years after its first season, it began airing news live.

Notable alumni
Joel Pimentel - Former member of CNCO
New Boyz - Earl "Ben J" Benjamin and Dominic "Legacy" Thomas (rap group)
Marcel Reece - NFL player
Chris Smith - MLB pitcher
Melina Perez - wrestler

Career College Resource Center
Hesperia High School offers a Career, College, and Resource Center in order to assist students with finding the appropriate career, finding the appropriate college, and receiving help with signing up for financial aid.

References

External links
Official website
Hesperia High School Resources

Public high schools in California
High schools in San Bernardino County, California
1984 establishments in California